MSSP may refer to: 
 Managed Security Service Provider, who provides security services for companies
 Microsoft Smooth Streaming Protocol, a computer networking protocol designed to support adaptive media streaming
 Mobile Service Switching Point, see Service Switching Point
 Medicare Shared Savings Program, established by section 3022 of the Affordable Care Act
 Master Synchronous Serial Port, a module of a PIC microcontroller that is used for communication with other peripherals
 Missionary Society of St Paul (Malta)